An assisted person has several meanings in law, referring generally to indigent people.

Under Great Britain statutory law, one who is eligible for Legal aid.  It also refers to such a person under Scottish law.

Under U.S. Bankruptcy law, it is also a person who applies to a debt relief agency.  A debt relief agency is "any person who provides any bankruptcy assistance to an assisted person in return for the payment of money or other valuable consideration, or who is a bankruptcy petition preparer" under . "The term 'assisted person' means any person whose debts consist primarily of consumer debts and the value of whose nonexempt property is less than $150,000." (3).  Debt relief agencies are subject to certain rules regarding information they must provide to an assisted person.

External links
The American Bar Association has an article on this topic:ABA web site

References

Bankruptcy
Fair trial rights
Civil liberties in the United States